Agyneta innotabilis is a species of sheet weaver found in Europe and Russia. It was described by O.P.-Cambridge in 1863.

References

innotabilis
Spiders of Europe
Spiders of Russia
Spiders described in 1863